Conejos County Hospital is a critical access hospital in La Jara, Colorado, in Conejos County. The hospital has  17 beds.

The hospital is a Level IV trauma center.

The hospital serves Conejos and Costilla counties in the San Luis Valley. It is the only emergency service provider in the two counties.

History and organization
The hospital was established in 1963. It was originally started and staffed by Mennonites who continued running the hospital through the 1970s. The hospital completed a $6 million expansion in 2019, which included an upgrade to its emergency rooms.

The hospital is one of two hospitals (and several regional clinics) that make up San Luis Valley Health (SLV Health), a small hospital network. The other hospital in the network is the San Luis Valley Regional Medical Center in Alamosa. SLV Health was founded in 2013.

References

External links
Hospital website

Hospitals in Colorado
Buildings and structures in Conejos County, Colorado
Hospitals established in 1963
1963 establishments in Colorado